"Big Ole Freak" is a song by American rapper Megan Thee Stallion. It was released to US rhythmic contemporary radio on January 22, 2019, as a single from her 2018 EP Tina Snow. It debuted at number 99 on the US Billboard Hot 100, before ascending to number 65, becoming Megan Thee Stallion's first charting song. The single was certified Platinum by the RIAA for selling over 1 million units. "Big Ole Freak" has been noted by critics as one of Megan’s breakout songs that jumpstarted her career.

Background
The song samples Immature's song, "Is It Love This Time", from their debut album, On Our Worst Behavior (1992)The song also samples the baseline of Al B. Sure!'s song Nite and Day.

Critical reception
Rolling Stone noted that the song has a "frankly carnal rap" and an "airy melody". Billboard called it a "saucy club banger" with a "thumping melody" and an "unapologetic spirit", and said the "vocally gifted MC has the razor-sharp delivery to potentially lead a new era of hip-hop".

Music video
The music video, directed by Munachi Osegbu, was released in February 2019.

Charts

Weekly charts

Year-end charts

Certifications

References

2019 songs
2019 singles
300 Entertainment singles
Megan Thee Stallion songs
Songs written by Megan Thee Stallion